Keeping the Night Watch is a children's poetry book written by Hope Anita Smith and illustrated by E. B. Lewis. Published by Henry Holt and Co as the sequel to Smith's The Way a Door Closes, it was a Coretta Scott King Author Honor Book and appeared on several best children's book lists in 2009.

Summary
The book is a series of poems from the perspective of thirteen-year-old C.J. Washington III, the narrator from Smith's 2003 poetry book The Way a Door Closes. While the prequel captures the experiences and emotions of a family abandoned by their father, Keeping the Night Watch explores C.J.'s subsequent struggles with the unexpected return of his father and expands on intersecting issues of adolescence, poverty, and urban life.

Awards and honors
 Coretta Scott King Author Honor Book (2009)
 School Library Journal’s Best Books of 2008
 American Library Association Notable Children's Books (2009)

References

2008 children's books
2008 poetry books
African-American poetry
American children's books
American poetry collections
Children's poetry books
Henry Holt and Company books